Frogs Hollow is a locality in New South Wales, Australia. It is located on the Princes Highway, 13 kilometers south of Bega and 19 kilometers north of Merimbula. It is home to Majestic Motorhomes, Frogs Hollow Airfield, and a Go-kart track, all clearly visible on Google Maps.

Its population is not reported separately in the Census; it is included in the statistical area of "Kanoona".

References

Towns in New South Wales
Bega Valley Shire